The 1999 Minnesota Lynx season was the inaugural season of the franchise.

Offseason

September 15, 1998 WNBA allocation

April 6, 1999 Expansion Draft

May 3, 1999 Post Expansion Draft Player Allocation

May 14, 1999 WNBA Draft

Regular season

Season standings

Season Schedule

Player stats

Tonya Edwards ranked second in the WNBA in Three Point Field Goals with 66
Katie Smith ranked sixth in the WNBA in Three Point Field Goals, 52
Katie Smith ranked eighth in the WNBA in Three Point Field Goal Attempts with, 136
Katie Smith ranked ninth in the WNBA in Three Point Field Goal Percentage, (.382)

Awards and honors
Tonya Edwards led the WNBA in Three Point Field Goal Attempts with 192

References

External links
Lynx on Basketball Reference

Minnesota Lynx seasons
Minnesota
Minnesota Lynx